Tatry Running Tour is a stage structured trail running competition. It is organized mainly for running enthusiasts who would like to enhance their stay in the High Tatras.

Tatry Running Tour 2011
Tatry Running Tour 2011 was the 1st edition of the three stage trail running competition.
Stage 3.5 km  Night Run, Ascent/Descent: 30 m
Stage 12.1 km Panorama Run, Ascent/Descent:320 m
Stage 5.5 km Cross Run, Ascent/Descent: 280 m

 Maps and profile

Tatry Running Tour 2012

Tatry Running Tour 2012 was the 2nd edition of the three stage trail running competition.
Stage 3.5 km  Night Run, Ascent/Descent: 30 m
Stage 12.1 km Panorama Run, Ascent/Descent:320 m
Stage 5.5 km Cross Run, Ascent/Descent: 280 m

Maps and profile

Tatry Running Tour 2013

Tatry Running Tour 2013 was the 3rd edition of the three stage trail running competition.
Stage 3.5 km Night Run, Ascent/Descent: 30 m
Stage 12.1 km Cross Run, Ascent/Descent:320 m
Stage 7.5 km  Interski Run, Ascent/Descent: 280 m

Tatry Running Tour 2014
Tatry Running Tour 2014 was the 4th edition of the three stage trail running competition.
Stage 3.5 km Night Run, Ascent/Descent: 30 m
Stage 12.1 km Cross Run, Ascent/Descent:320 m
Stage 7.5 km  Interski Run, Ascent/Descent: 280 m

Tatry Running Tour 2015
CLASSIC
Tatry Running Tour 2015 was the 5th edition of the three stage trail running competition.
Stage 4.5 km Night Run, Ascent/Descent: 30 m
Stage 10.1 km Cross Run, Ascent/Descent:320 m
Stage 7.5 km  Interski Run, Ascent/Descent: 280 m

EXTREME
Tatry Running Tour Extreme 2015 was the 1st edition of the three stage trail running competition.
Stage 4.5 km Night Run, Ascent/Descent: 30 m
Stage 33 km, Sky & Clouds Run Ascent/Descent: 935m 
Stage 7.5 km  Interski Run, Ascent/Descent: 280 m

Tatry Running Tour 2016
CLASSIC
Tatry Running Tour 2016 was the 6th edition of the three stage trail running competition.
Stage 4.5 km Night Run, Ascent/Descent: 30 m
Stage 12.5 km Cross Run, Ascent/Descent:320 m
Stage 7.5 km  Interski Run, Ascent/Descent: 280 m

EXTREME
Tatry Running Tour Extreme 2016 was the 2nd edition of the three stage trail running competition.
Stage 4.5 km Night Run, Ascent/Descent: 30 m
Stage 33 km, Sky & Clouds Run Ascent/Descent: 935m 
Stage 7.5 km  Interski Run, Ascent/Descent: 280 m

Maps and profile

Sky & Clouds Run 21km / 33km 
Sky & Clouds Run 21 km, Ascent/Descent: 935m. 
Alpine extreme half marathon distance. The Sky & Clouds Run takes place together with the 2nd stage of the Tatry Running Tour. The runners continue up to the highest point at the elevation of 2140 m.

Tatry Running Tour 2017
CLASSIC
Tatry Running Tour 2017 was the 7th edition of the three stage trail running competition.
Stage 4.5 km Night Run, Ascent/Descent: 30 m
Stage 12.5 km Cross Run, Ascent/Descent:320 m
Stage 7.5 km  Interski Run, Ascent/Descent: 280 m

EXTREME
Tatry Running Tour Extreme 2017 was the 3nd edition of the three stage trail running competition.
Stage 4.5 km Night Run, Ascent/Descent: 30 m
Stage 33 km, Sky & Clouds Run Ascent/Descent: 935m 
Stage 7.5 km  Interski Run, Ascent/Descent: 280 m

Sky & Clouds Run 21km / 33km 
Sky & Clouds Run 21 km, Ascent/Descent: 935m. 
Alpine extreme half marathon distance. The Sky & Clouds Run takes place together with the 2nd stage of the Tatry Running Tour. The runners continue up to the highest point at the elevation of 2140 m.

Overall results 2017 (in Czech)

Tatry Running Tour 2018
CLASSIC
Tatry Running Tour 2018 was the 8th edition of the three stage trail running competition.
Stage 4.5 km Night Run, Ascent/Descent: 30 m
Stage 12.5 km Cross Run, Ascent/Descent:320 m
Stage 7.5 km  Interski Run, Ascent/Descent: 280 m

EXTREME
Tatry Running Tour Extreme 2018 was the 4th edition of the three stage trail running competition.
Stage 4.5 km Night Run, Ascent/Descent: 30 m
Stage 33 km, Sky & Clouds Run Ascent/Descent: 935m 
Stage 7.5 km  Interski Run, Ascent/Descent: 280 m

Sky & Clouds Run 21km / 33km 
Sky & Clouds Run 21 km, Ascent/Descent: 935m. 
Alpine extreme half marathon distance. The Sky & Clouds Run takes place together with the 2nd stage of the Tatry Running Tour. The runners continue up to the highest point at the elevation of 2140 m.

Overall results 2018 (in Czech)

Tatry Running Tour 2019
CLASSIC
Tatry Running Tour 2019 was the 9th edition of the three stage trail running competition.
Stage 4.5 km Night Run, Ascent/Descent: 30 m
Stage 12.5 km Cross Run, Ascent/Descent:320 m
Stage 7.5 km  Interski Run, Ascent/Descent: 280 m

EXTREME
Tatry Running Tour Extreme 2019 was the 5th edition of the three stage trail running competition.
Stage 4.5 km Night Run, Ascent/Descent: 30 m
Stage 33 km, Sky & Clouds Run Ascent/Descent: 935m 
Stage 7.5 km  Interski Run, Ascent/Descent: 280 m

Sky & Clouds Run 21km / 33km 
Sky & Clouds Run 21 km, Ascent/Descent: 935m. 
Alpine extreme half marathon distance. The Sky & Clouds Run takes place together with the 2nd stage of the Tatry Running Tour. The runners continue up to the highest point at the elevation of 2140 m.

Overall results 2019 (in Czech)

Winners Tatry Running Tour - CLASSIC

Winners Tatry Running Tour - EXTREME

Winner Sky&Clouds Run  22km / 33km

References

External links
 Official website

Trail running competitions
2011 establishments in Slovakia